The House Administration Subcommittee on Oversight was a subcommittee within the House Committee on House Administration. The subcommittee was created for the 112th Congress but was dissolved by the 113th Congress

Members, 112th Congress

External links
Official site

Administration Oversight